Čižiūnai is a village in  (Valkininkai) eldership, Varėna district municipality, Alytus County, southeastern Lithuania. According to the 2001 census, the village had a population of 199 people. At the 2011 census, the population was 129.

References

Villages in Varėna District Municipality